Nedjeljko Perić (born May 14, 1950) is a Croatian engineering professor.

Early life and education

Perić was born in Dubravica, Bosnia and Herzegovina. He graduated at the Faculty of Electrical Engineering in Zagreb in 1973, where he also received his PhD in 1989.

Career

After graduation he worked at the Rade Končar Electrical Engineering Institute in Zagreb. From 1993 he worked at the Faculty of Electrical Engineering and Computing in Zagreb, where he is a tenured professor (since 1997), head of the Department of Control and Computer Engineering (1996–1998, and 2000–2004) and dean (since 2010). His work deals with the automation of plants and processes.

Academy membership

Since 1998 he is a full member of the Croatian Academy of Engineering. In 2007 he was awarded the National Award for Science. He was a member (1995–2005) and the president (2000–2005) of the National Committee for Electrical Engineering and Computing, member of the Regional Council for Technical Sciences (1994–2000, 2005-), and member of the Science Council (1994–2000) at the Ministry of Science and Technology of the Republic of Croatia.

References

Living people
1960 births
Engineers from Zagreb
University of Zagreb alumni
Academic staff of the University of Zagreb
People from Čapljina